Jennings Carmichael (24 February 1867 – 9 February 1904) was an Australian poet and nurse.

Life
Grace Elizabeth Jennings Carmichael was born on 24 February 1867 at Ballarat, Victoria. The daughter of Archibald Carmichael, a miner from Perthshire, Scotland and Margaret Jennings, née Clark, from Cornwall. She was educated at Melbourne, while still a child went to live on a station at Orbost, and grew up close to the bush she came to love so much. She went to Melbourne to be trained as a nurse at the Royal Children's Hospital, Melbourne.

Carmichael joined the Buonarottii Club before 1887, and was a member of the Austral Salon in the 1890s giving a public lecture on "The Spirit of the Bush" in September 1895 at the Masonic Hall in Melbourne with Alfred Deakin as chairman.

In 1891, Carmichael published a small volume of prose sketches, Hospital Children. Having qualified as a nurse she obtained a position on a station near Geelong, and subsequently married Francis Mullis. She contributed verse to the Australasian, and in 1895 Poems by Jennings Carmichael was published.

Carmichael lived for a time in South Australia and then went to London, where she died of pneumonia in poor circumstances in 1904. In 1910 a small selection of her poems was published, in 1937 a plaque to her memory was unveiled at Orbost, and a year later a replica was placed in the public library at Ballarat. Two of Jennings Carmichael's sons were present at the ceremony.

Jennings Carmichael wrote much good and pleasant verse with occasional touches of poetry. Brunton Stephens called Miss Carmichael the Jean Ingelow of Australia. Comparisons of this kind have little value, but it may be said that Miss Carmichael's position in relation to the leading Australian poets, is not dissimilar to that of Miss Ingelow in comparison with Robert Browning and Alfred Tennyson, 1st Baron Tennyson.

Works

 Hospital Children : sketches of life and character in the Children's Hospital, Melbourne (1891)
 Poems (1895)
 For Some One's Sake (1955)

Personal life 
Carmichael married Henry Francis Mullis on 1 April 1895 in Fitzroy. Carmichael had four sons and a daughter.

References

1867 births
1904 deaths
Australian women poets
19th-century Australian poets
People from Ballarat
19th-century Australian women writers
20th-century Australian poets
20th-century Australian women writers